Carl-Heinz Rühl (14 November 1939 – 30 December 2019) was a German football player and manager.

Honours
 DFB-Pokal: 1967–68

References

External links
 

1939 births
2019 deaths
German footballers
Association football forwards
Hertha BSC players
MSV Duisburg players
1. FC Köln players
Bundesliga players
German football managers
Karlsruher SC managers
Borussia Dortmund managers
MSV Duisburg managers
TSV 1860 Munich managers
Aris Thessaloniki F.C. managers
Bundesliga managers
VfL Osnabrück managers
Footballers from Berlin